Vrang (Russian and Tajik: Вранг) is a village and jamoat located in the Wakhan region of Tajikistan. It is located in Ishkoshim District in Gorno-Badakhshan Autonomous Region. The jamoat has a total population of 6,541 (2015).

Religion
Vrang is home to a stupa of unknown origin, which may have originally been a Zoroastrian fire temple.

References

Populated places in Gorno-Badakhshan